Reinieri Joel Mayorquín Gámez (born 13 July 1989 in San Pedro Sula) is a Honduran football player, who most recently played for F.C. Motagua.  He has previously played for Norwegian club Aalesunds FK.

Club career

Aalesunds FK
Mayorquín joined Aalesund on a season-long loan-deal in March 2009. He played in the first three cup-matches in the 2009 Norwegian Football Cup, which Aalesund won, and impressed head coach Kjetil Rekdal in the second round tie against Kristiansund BK.

Mayorquín made his debut in Tippeligaen on 1 June 2009, coming off the bench in a 2-1 win at Sandefjord, but Aalesund did not want to use the option to sign him permanently so he returned to Marathón. Mayorquín made four appearances as a substitute in Tippeligaen.

International career
Mayorquín played at the 2009 FIFA World Youth Championship in Egypt.

References

External links
 Guardian Football
 

1989 births
Living people
People from San Pedro Sula
Association football midfielders
Honduran footballers
C.D. Marathón players
F.C. Motagua players
Aalesunds FK players
Liga Nacional de Fútbol Profesional de Honduras players
Honduran Liga Nacional de Ascenso players
Eliteserien players
Honduran expatriate footballers
Expatriate footballers in Norway
Honduran expatriate sportspeople in Norway